Macy is a surname. Notable people with the name include:

Anne Sullivan Macy, teacher of Helen Keller (better known as Anne Sullivan)
Bill Macy (1922–2019), actor
Jesse Macy (1842–1919), political scientist and historian
Joanna Macy, environmental activist and author
John B. Macy (1799–1856), U.S. Representative from Wisconsin
Kyle Macy (born 1957), American basketball player, coach, and broadcaster
Robin Lynn Macy, founding member of the country group Dixie Chicks
Rowland Hussey Macy, Sr. (1822–1877), American department store founder
Thomas Macy (1608–1682), settler
William H. Macy (born 1950), American actor